Grigori Giovanni Méndez Granados (born 30 December 1972) is a Colombian football manager and former player who played as a defender.

Career
Méndez was born in Bogotá, and played for Independiente Santa Fe before moving to the United States in 2000 to work as a women's coach. He subsequently worked in Argentina with Quilmes before returning to his home country to work at Academia. 

In 2010, Méndez returned to Santa Fe to work as a youth coach. He was also an assistant manager of the main squad in 2019, when Gerardo Bedoya was a manager.

On 23 August 2021, Méndez was named manager of Santa Fe's main squad, replacing Harold Rivera. He remained in the position until the end of the season when he was recalled to the club's under-20 squad, but was appointed as interim manager of the first squad shortly after the dismissal of manager Martín Cardetti in late April 2022.

On 27 May 2022, Méndez was announced as manager of Jaguares de Córdoba. On 13 September, Jaguares announced his resignation from the position.

References

External links

1972 births
Living people
People from Bogotá
Colombian footballers
Association football defenders
Independiente Santa Fe footballers
Colombian football managers
Categoría Primera A managers
Independiente Santa Fe managers
Jaguares de Córdoba managers
Colombian expatriate sportspeople in the United States
Colombian expatriate sportspeople in Argentina